Tamocha Bedi is a Botswana footballer who currently plays as a striker for TAFIC. He won one cap for the Botswana national football team in 2002.

External links

Living people
Association football forwards
Botswana footballers
Botswana international footballers
Nico United players
TAFIC F.C. players
Year of birth missing (living people)